Mike Seth (born September 20, 1987) is an American soccer player who most recently played for Colorado Springs Switchbacks in the USL Championship.

Career

College and Amateur
Seth attended Baldwin High School and played club soccer for Century United, before playing four years of college soccer at Penn State Erie, The Behrend College. At PSB Seth was a four-time all-AMCC player, and helped his team capture an AMCC Championship in 2007.

During his college years Seth also played with Colorado Rapids U23's in the USL Premier Development League.

Professional
Undrafted out of college, Seth trialled with the Harrisburg City Islanders, and spent most of 2009 training with Major League Soccer side Colorado Rapids.

He turned professional in 2010 when he signed for the Pittsburgh Riverhounds of the USL Second Division, and made his professional debut on May 15, 2010 in a game against Charleston Battery. The club, now playing in the USL Pro league, re-signed him for the 2011 season on March 15, 2011.

Colorado Springs Switchbacks 
Seth moved to Colorado Springs Switchbacks on February 3, 2015. Seth ended his first season with the Colorado Springs Switchbacks with 3 goals and 2 assist in 26 appearances.

On January 19, 2016, Seth resigned with the Colorado Springs Switchbacks for the 2016 USL Pro Season.

On March 12, 2016, Seth scored in a 3-2 preseason victory over UCCS.

Phoenix Rising 
On December 7, 2016, Seth joined Phoenix Rising FC

San Antonio FC 
On August 10, 2017 Seth signed with San Antonio FC

References

1987 births
Living people
American soccer players
Colorado Rapids U-23 players
Pittsburgh Riverhounds SC players
Colorado Springs Switchbacks FC players
Phoenix Rising FC players
USL League Two players
USL Second Division players
USL Championship players
Soccer players from Pittsburgh
Association football midfielders
Association football forwards